Milbert may refer to:
 Milbert Amplifiers, American manufacturer of high-end audio equipment
 Jacques-Gérard Milbert, a French naturalist and artist